Silvina Bosco was an Argentine actress.

Although she worked more in television in series such as Chiquititas, she appeared in a number of popular Argentine films such as Buenos Aires me mata (1998), La Fuga, Animalada and Arregui, la noticia del día (2001), and Apasionados in 2002.

In 2004 she appeared in the acclaimed films: Conversaciones con mamá and Whisky Romeo Zulu.

Death

On 30 April, 2019 she died after spending time hospitalized for cancer.

Filmography
 El Hombre que ganó la razón (1986)
 El Censor (1995)
 La Sonámbula (1998)
 Buenos Aires me mata (1998)
 El Visitante (1999)
 Animalada (2001)
 Arregui, la noticia del día (2001)
 La Fuga (2001)
 Te besaré mañana (2001)
 Causa efecto (2001)
 El Transcurso de las cosas (2001)
 Apasionados (2002)
 Click (2003)
 Un Día en el paraíso (2003)
 Vivir Intentando (2003)
 Whisky Romeo Zulu (2004)
 Dolores de casada (2004)
 Conversaciones con mamá (2004)
 El Abrazo partido (2004)
 Esas noches de insomnio (2005)

Television
 "Amigovios" (1995)
 "Último verano, El" (1996)
 "Milady, la historia continúa" (1997)
 "Susana Giménez" (1998)
 "Socios y más" (1998)
 "Desesperadas por el aire" (1998)
 "Chiquititas" (1995)
 "Poné a Francella" (2001)
 "Maridos a domicilio" (2002)
 "Kachorra" (2002)
 "Infieles" (2002) (mini)
 "Tres padres solteros" (2003)
 "Rebelde Way" (2003)
 "Abre tus ojos" (2003)
 "Floricienta" (2004)
 "Amor mío" (2006)
 "El Código Rodriguez" (2006)

References

External links
 
 

Argentine film actresses
2019 deaths
Actresses from Buenos Aires
1966 births